Chapel of the Cross may refer to:

 Chapel of the Cross (Mannsdale, Mississippi), listed on the NRHP in Mississippi
 Chapel of the Cross (Chapel Hill, North Carolina), listed on the NRHP in North Carolina